Vicky Smith is an English table tennis player.

Vicky was number 1 in England in the under 18 girls in 2012 and she has been part of the England National Team since she was 14.

Vicky started playing at 4 years old as her father created a small table tennis club at the local community centre. The first tournament Vicky remembers playing was the Plymouth Primary Schools event for under 11s, where she won aged 6. She had won the Home International Singles, received Gold in the School Games where she had the privilege to compete in the 2012 Olympic venue, and received Bronze in the World Schools in Italy.

Vicky was picked to play in the European Youths in Austria in 2012.

During the 2012 London Olympics, Vicky was the first torch bearer of the Olympic torch at the starting location in Land’s End on 19 May 2012.

She stopped playing in international tournaments after 2012 to focus on her education but has remained in the top 20 of the English women's rankings and was selected by England Schools to compete in the 2014 Home Internationals, winning both singles and doubles titles. She has continued to represent YHL in the Premier Division of the Women's British League with Yolanda King and Rachel Trevorrow, winning the title in 2016-17.

Education 

Vicky completed her study of Medicine at the University of East Anglia in 2019.

Junior results

References

 Vicky Smith to make England Under-18 table tennis debut in Poland

English female table tennis players
Year of birth missing (living people)
Living people
Place of birth missing (living people)
Alumni of the University of East Anglia